The 1927 LSU Tigers football team represented Louisiana State University (LSU) in the 1927 Southern Conference football season.  LSU did not celebrate a homecoming game in 1927.

Tackle Jess Tinsley became the first LSU player selected as a first team All-Southern player since 1919. He would be the only player from LSU to be named All-Southern in the 1920s.

Schedule

References

LSU
LSU Tigers football seasons
LSU Tigers football